Hloušek is a Czech surname. Notable people with the surname include:

 Adam Hloušek (born 1988), Czech footballer
 Martin Hloušek (born 1979), Slovak footballer
 Vítězslav Hloušek (1914–?), Czech basketball player

Czech-language surnames